Rubén Fernando García González (born 20 August 1982) is a former Mexican footballer, who last played as a goalkeeper for Tiburones Rojos de Veracruz in Liga MX.

Club career
García made his professional debut on 6 October 2001 at age 19 for Pachuca in a game against Toluca. He replaced his colleague, second-string goalkeeper Jesus Salvador Alfaro, who had been red-carded in a 3–3 tie. He played the last 4 minutes of the game, was scored on by Víctor Ruiz and Toluca won the game, 4–3.

He was inactive for a period, until he reappeared with Lobos BUAP in 2005, playing in two games and allowing just two goals.

He later signed on with La Piedad.

References

External links
 

1982 births
Living people
Sportspeople from Pachuca
Footballers from Hidalgo (state)
Association football goalkeepers
C.F. Pachuca players
Lobos BUAP footballers
La Piedad footballers
C.D. Veracruz footballers
Liga MX players
Mexican footballers